Jiwani Airport  is situated 10 km away from the city centre of Jiwani in Balochistan. It is not a major airport of Pakistan. At this time, there is no scheduled service to or from the airport. Jiwani or Jwani is a town and commercial port that is located along the Gulf of Oman in the Gwadar District of the Balochistan province in Pakistan. It is located near the Pakistani border with Iran. With the Makran Coastal Highway now reaching Jiwani from Gwadar and also connecting Karachi, Jiwani is a place to be seen especially by those who are interested in observing history more closely.

Jiwani is 34 km from the Iranian border. Jiwani holds strategic importance in the region, located immediately adjacent to the shipping lanes to and from the Persian Gulf. This is the main reason that the town hosts a relatively large sized naval base and an mud track airport with a 5,500-foot runway which is still accountable to be operational.

Mangrove forest

The area around the bay includes an important mangrove forest extending across the international border, and is an important habitat for a wide variety of wildlife, especially the endangered Olive Ridley and Green Turtles. Plans to grant fishing concessions and offshore drilling rights are potentially a threat to the wildlife of the area.

The population largely depends upon fishing. There are a number of export oriented fish freezing plants located in Jiwani.

World War II
Also known as RAF Jiwani, during World War II, the airport was also used by the United States Army Air Forces Air Transport Command. It functioned as a  stopover en route to Sharjah Airport, UAE or Karachi Airport, Pakistan on the Karachi-Cairo route. Visiting the barracks area of the base used during the World War II in Jiwani reveals many handwritten small stories and names of allied Pilots. There is a water system which is now abandoned for use but is a marvel of civil works and holds great uniqueness for meeting water requirements of the base. It used to store rain water in three stages in order to clean the water using its usual flow. The water was then pumped to the base and also up to the Victoria Hut which is nearly 5 km from the water tank system.

See also
 List of airports in Pakistan

References

External links

Jiwani
Airports in Balochistan, Pakistan
Gwadar District
Airfields of the United States Army Air Forces in British India
Airfields of the United States Army Air Forces Air Transport Command in the China-Burma-India Theater
World War II sites in India